Honarmand is a surname. Notable people with the surname include: 

Aliasghar Honarmand, Iranian journalist
Mohammad-Reza Honarmand (born 1955), Iranian film director, screenwriter and producer